The 2022–23 season is the fifth season in Indian professional football club Rajasthan United FC's existence, and their 2nd season in I-League. In addition to the I-League, Rajasthan United will also participate in the Durand Cup and the Super Cup.

First-team squad 
As of 24 January 2023

Transfers and loans

Transfers In

Loans in

Transfers out

Management

Pre-season and friendlies

Competition

Overview

Durand Cup

Rajasthan United were drawn in the Group B for the 131st edition of the Durand Cup along with three other ISL sides.

Group stage

Matches

Quarter-finals

Baji Rout Cup

Matches

Quarter finals

Semi finals

Final

I-League

League table

League Results by Round

Matches 
Note: I-league announced the fixtures for the 2022–23 season on 1 November 2022.

Super Cup 

After finishing 9th in the I-League, Rajasthan United will have to play a qualifying playoff against 10th-ranked NEROCA to earn a place in the qualifiers.

Matches

Qualifying Playoff

Squad statistics

Goal scorers

References 

2022–23 I-League by team
Rajasthan United FC seasons